William is a masculine given name. It may also refer to:


People 
 List of people named William, a list of people with the given name
 Morgan William (born 1996), American women's basketball player
 will.i.am (born 1975), American musician, member of the Black Eyed Peas
 William (footballer, born 1933), full name William José de Assis Filho, Brazilian football defender
 William (footballer, born 1967), full name William Amaral de Andrade, Brazilian football manager and former centre-back
 William (footballer, born 1968), full name William César de Oliveira, Brazilian football midfielder
 William (footballer, born 1977), full name Gilberto William Fabbro, Brazilian football attacking midfielder
 William (footballer, born 1982), full name William Arthur Conceição dos Santos, Brazilian football striker
 William (footballer, born 1983), full name William Júnior Salles de Lima Souza, Brazilian football striker
 William (footballer, born 1995), full name William de Asevedo Furtado, Brazilian football right-back
 William (footballer, born 1996), full name João William Alves de Jesus, Brazilian football defender

Places 
 William, United States Virgin Islands, a settlement on the island of Saint Croix
 William, West Virginia,  an unincorporated community

Arts and entertainment 
 William (TV series), BBC television series of 1962 to 1963, based on Just William books
 "William" (Haven), an episode of the TV series Haven
 "William" (song), from the album The Others by English indie rock band The Others

Other uses
 William (1770 ship), merchantman and convict ship
 William (horse), a racehorse
 William Street (disambiguation), various streets and people

See also
 Williams (disambiguation)